Kozachok or Kazachok is a traditional Ukrainian folk dance originating with the Cossacks in the 16th century. In the 17th and 18th centuries it was performed throughout contemporary Ukraine and also in the noble courts of Europe. It is a fast, linear, couple-dance in  time, typically in a constantly increasing tempo and of an improvisatory character, typically in a minor key in Ukraine, and in a major key in Russia. The woman leads and the man follows, imitating her figures – she signals movement changes by hand clapping. In the 17th century, kozachok became fashionable in court music in Europe.

The term "kozachok" can be traced back to the Vertep, the 16th to 19th-century Ukrainian itinerant puppet theatre. Vertep plays consisted of two parts, the first dramatizing the birth of Christ, and the second with a secular plot, often a morality tale.  In Russia there exist different versions of the kozachok dance the Kuban Kazachok (Krasnodar region of southern Russia), and Terek Kazachok (northern Caucasus region). Historically these regions had an important Ukrainian population which was significantly reduced in the Soviet era.

In Ukraine, it was often a joyful celebration centred on the Cossacks from the Zaporizhian region, who sang, played the bandura, and danced. This dance became known as the "Vertepny Kozachok", literally meaning "A Cossack from Vertep" and displayed all the characteristics of the fiery Kozak temperament. Russias west-central regions like the Belgorod Oblast played an important role in East Slavic dances. In Russia, many cultural treasures can still be traced to their roots, such as to the Kozachok region in Belgorod. That historically had a large Ukrainian population.

The Ukrainian choreographer and dancer Vasyl Avramenko, known for his standardization of Ukrainian dance and his work across the globe, was famous for his "Kozachok Podilskyi", a Cossack courtship dance native to the Podillia region, for one to four couples. He most likely learned the "Kozachok Podilskyi" from the theatre work he did between 1917 and 1921 sources from the repertoire of dances performed in plays generations before including plays by Ukrainian dramaturge and writer Marko Kropyvnytskyi.

The first known musical arrangement of the kоzachok for lute is attributed to the Polish nobleman and composer Kazimierz Stanisław Rudomina-Dusiacki in the 17th century. There are manuscript collections of kozachok melodies from the second half of the 18th century, and printed collections begin to appear toward the end of that century. Dusiacki's score was preserved in the Berlin State Library under the name "Dusiacki-Buch".

Kozachok melodies were used in Polish music in the 18th century.

See also 
 Hopak, a Ukrainian folk dance that originated among the Zaporozhian Cossacks
 Ukrainian folk dance
 Russian folk dance

Notes

References

Sources 
 Bobri, Vladimir – Notes on the Ukrainian Folk Dances //Guitar review - #33, Summer, 1970 p. 27
 Ukrayins'ke kozatstvo – (Entsyklopedia) Kiev, 2006



Cossack culture
Ukrainian folk dances